Cwm Head is a hamlet in Shropshire, England. The name is part-Welsh, part-English and means "Head of the Valley".

From Cwm Head, the B4370 heads downhill both towards Marshbrook and in the other direction towards Horderley and the A489.

There is a Church of England parish church at Cwm Head - "St Michael and All Angels". It was built in 1845 to a neo-Norman design by H. C. Whitling and is built largely of stone.

To the northwest is the hamlet of Hamperley while to the northeast (towards Marshbrook) is the hamlet of Whittingslow.

The hamlet lies between 226m and 232m above sea level.

References

Hamlets in Shropshire